The Christen Larsen House at 990 N. 400 E in Pleasant Grove, Utah was built in c.1876.  It was listed on the National Register of Historic Places in 1987.

It is a one-story pair-house built of soft tufa rock.

See also
Neils Peter Larsen House, also NRHP-listed in Pleasant Grove

References

Pair-houses
Houses on the National Register of Historic Places in Utah
Neoclassical architecture in Utah
Houses completed in 1876
Houses in Utah County, Utah
National Register of Historic Places in Utah County, Utah
Buildings and structures in Pleasant Grove, Utah